Paper splitting is a method of preserving brittle papers often found in library and archival materials.  In this process the front and back of a sheet of paper are split apart.  A piece of acid-free paper is placed between these two sides of an acidic sheet before the pages are reconnected.  The intention is to reduce the acid deterioration in the paper.  A paper-splitting machine has been developed, but is not in wide use.

External links
Folger Shakespeare Library, "Paper splitting and the Trevelyon manuscript"
Library of Congress, "Paper Strengthening through Paper Splitting "

Preservation (library and archival science)